The Battle of Nepheris was the second battle of the Third Punic War that took place at Nepheris in late 147 BC. The battle was fought between the forces of the Roman Republic, commanded by Scipio Aemilianus, and the forces of Carthage who were commanded by Diogenes of Carthage.

Context
After the Roman defeat at the Battle of the Port of Carthage, Scipio Aemilianus decided to destroy the Carthaginian army at Nepheris, a stronghold south of the capital where the previous year the Romans had suffered a defeat at the First Battle of Nepheris against Hasdrubal the Boeotarch.

The battle
In 147 BC, the Romans blockaded Carthage and effectively cut off all supplies being sent to the defenders at Nepheris whose defense was being conducted by Diogenes of Carthage. Scipio surrounded the Carthaginian camp, forcing them to come out and give battle against the smaller Roman army. Surrounded on all sides, the Carthaginians were soundly defeated, losing thousands of soldiers during the course of the battle. The majority of the remainder of the Carthaginian force was taken prisoner; only 4,000 managed to slip away. The capture of Nepheris marked the turning point in the morale of the defenders of Carthage, which would fall a few months later.

See also

 Punic Wars

References

 
 Appian of Alexandria, The Punic Wars , "The Third Punic War"
 Digital Atlas of the Roman Empire, "Nepheris"

Neferis
Nepheris
Nepheris (147 BC)
Nepheris (147 BC)
140s BC
140s BC conflicts